A tokotoko is a traditional Māori carved ceremonial walking stick. On a marae it is a symbol of authority and status for the speaker holding it.

Poets from New Zealand who win the award of New Zealand Poet Laureate are presented with a tokotoko, typically by a National Librarian of New Zealand.

See also
Ruyi (scepter)
Talking stick
Cane

References

Māori culture